Erardo Danilo Cóccaro Díaz (born 22 August 1991) is an Uruguayan football player who plays for Villa Teresa in Uruguay.

National
He has been capped by the Uruguay national under-20 football team for the pre-squad for the 2011 South American Youth Championship.

References

External links
 

1991 births
Living people
Uruguayan footballers
Uruguayan expatriate footballers
C.A. Progreso players
Racing Club de Montevideo players
C.A. Rentistas players
FC Dinamo Minsk players
Fuerza Amarilla S.C. footballers
Villa Teresa players
C.A. Cerro players
Uruguayan Primera División players
Uruguayan Segunda División players
Ecuadorian Serie A players
Belarusian Premier League players
Association football forwards
Uruguayan expatriate sportspeople in Ecuador
Expatriate footballers in Belarus
Expatriate footballers in Ecuador